SS Rodina was a Bulgarian Cargo Ship that struck a mine in the Black Sea  off Tsarevo, Bulgaria.

Construction 
Rodina was constructed in 1922 at the Vulcan A. G. shipyard in Hamburg, Germany. She had a Triple expansion steam engine driving a single screw propeller and the engine was rated at 260 nhp.

Sinking 
There were no casualties.

References

Steamships of Bulgaria
Ships built in Hamburg
Ships sunk by mines
1922 ships
Ships sunk with no fatalities
World War II shipwrecks in the Black Sea
Maritime incidents in September 1941